Bakery or Zak the Baker is a kosher restaurant in the Wynwood neighborhood of Miami, Florida. After the bakery was moved into a larger building, Zak the Baker opened a new glatt kosher delicatessen in January 2017 in the old bakery location. The associated bakery and café were both founded by local baker Zak Stern. The bakery closes on Saturdays, in keeping with kosher requirements.

The bakery has developed a reputation for its sourdough bread, among other items such as challah bread.

Recognition
In 2013, Zak Stern was named Best Baker by the Miami New Times in their Best of Miami Awards. In 2014 the Zak the Baker Wynwood Bakery & Cafe won Best Bakery in the Best of Miami Awards, and Stern won the Baking & Pastry Chef of the Year award at the JWU Zest Awards for his work with the restaurant in 2015.

See also

 List of kosher restaurants
 List of bakeries
 List of delicatessens

References

External links
Zakthebaker.com

Jews and Judaism in Miami-Dade County, Florida
Milchig restaurants
Restaurants established in 2012
Companies based in Miami
Restaurants in Miami  
2012 establishments in Florida
Bakeries of the United States
Kosher bakeries